Plus belle la vie (More beautiful life) is a French television soap opera based on an idea by Hubert Besson and characters created by Georges Desmouceaux, Bénédicte Achard, Magaly Richard-Serrano and Olivier Szulzynger. On air from 30 August 2004 18 November 2022, it was shown on France 3 on Monday to Friday evenings at 8:15 p.m. The show began with 17 main actors and gained more later.

On 11 July 2008, France 3 broadcast its 1000th episode, a milestone in French television. The series set a second record on 8 June 2012, airing its 2000th episode. On 22 April 2016, it broadcast its 3000th episode, and on 21 February 2020, its 4000th.

Plot
The series follows the daily lives of the inhabitants of "Le Mistral", a fictional neighbourhood in the Mediterranean port city of Marseille, where wealthy and less than wealthy families co-exist. It focuses on their evolving love lives and friendships evolve and on the criminal intrigues in which certain residents of the neighbourhood are involved.

Main cast

Recurring Cast

Impact

The series struggled to find its footing in the first season, but after striving to create more dynamic story lines, by the second season Plus belle la vie enjoyed regular audiences of five million viewers. On Valentine's Day 2006, a plot involving Nicolas Barrel's death drew an audience of 6,329,600. On 17 November 2008 Plus belle la vie received its highest ratings ever with over 6.8 million viewers and a 24.9% audience share.

For several years, the series regularly averaged audiences in excess of 5 million viewers and audience shares above 20% each weekday evening. In recent seasons, its viewing numbers have gradually declined. 

This ratings slump worsened at the onset of the COVID-19 pandemic and, on 5 May 2022, France Télévisions announced the end of the series which took place on 18 November 2022, following "a substantial shift in viewing habits" after 18 years on air.

See also
 List of French television series

References

External links

 

2000s French drama television series
2004 French television series debuts
2010s French drama television series
France 3
France Télévisions television dramas
French LGBT-related television shows
French television soap operas
Television series about families
Television shows set in France
Television productions suspended due to the COVID-19 pandemic
2020s French drama television series
2022 French television series endings
Television shows set in Marseille